The Children is a 2008 British horror thriller film set around the New Year holiday directed by Tom Shankland, based on a story by Paul Andrew Williams and starring Eva Birthistle and Hannah Tointon. The story centers around an evil virus that turns all children into blood-thirsty monsters during a Christmas vacation. The film premiered on 5 December 2008 and received positive reviews from critics.

Plot
Elaine and Jonah are travelling with their two children, Miranda and Paulie, along with Casey (Elaine’s teenage daughter from a previous relationship), to spend the Christmas holidays and New Year with Elaine's older sister, Chloe. Chloe, her husband Robbie, and their two children, Nicky and Leah, welcome their visitors. Outside the house, Paulie vomits near the bushes, which his mother believes is due to being carsick.

As the night progresses, Nicky and Leah also begin to show symptoms of an illness. Leah coughs up some black bile, where strange forms of bacteria is seen proliferating exponentially. As everyone goes to bed, the family cat, Jinxie, goes missing. Casey, back at the woods, calls her friend to makes plans to escape and attend a party, but she's startled by Jinxie snarling. However, she is unable to find the cat. By the next day, all of the children have become seemingly pale and infected. The next day, the children and men are playing in the snow, and one of the children has Jinxie's collar in the play tent. Whilst Jonah and Robbie are having a discussion, Paulie shoves a sled downhill that hits Chloe's ankle, causing her to drop tea all over Jonah, scalding him. Jonah is angry enough to spank Paulie. Robbie goes for a smoke break in the greenhouse, and Casey joins him. He sees her tattoo and asks about it. It is a fetus, the umbilical cord connected to her belly button. Chloe interrupts them soon after. At dinner, Chloe mentions the tattoo, upsetting Elaine and embarrassing Casey. Miranda suddenly has a violent outburst, scratching Chloe and ruining the food. While Jonah tries to deal with Miranda upstairs, Robbie takes the rest of the children outside to play in the snow. As Robbie is sledding downhill, Nicky places a garden rake in the sled's path, which slices open Robbie's head on impact. The children scream, drawing the attention of Casey and the rest of the adults as Robbie bleeds out in the snow. Elaine phones an ambulance, but Robbie quickly dies from his injuries. The children then run off into the forest.

Casey attempts to find the children in the forest, and she finds Leah sobbing and coughing, but then as she gets closer, Leah starts laughing and is holding a knife, cutting into something. Casey, frightened, slips and falls into a puddle of vomit, as she screams. Meanwhile, Jonah tries to call the emergency services, but they are held up by the extremely snowy roads.

Paulie attacks Jonah with a knife, slicing his arm, then runs off before luring Elaine to a climbing frame and breaking her leg. Casey rescues her and they seek refuge in the greenhouse which is attacked by the kids with rocks. Paulie crawls inside and attempts to stab them but is fended off by Casey. Meanwhile, Chloe finds Robbie's body, mutilated inside the children's play tent; and is then attacked by Leah. Casey saves her, but Chloe panics, blaming Casey before fleeing into the house. Casey returns to the greenhouse and saves Elaine who in turn saves Casey by causing him to fall backwards onto a protruding glass shard, killing him. Jonah finds Paulie dead and attempts to hide him from Chloe. The group enter the house where Chloe accuses Casey and Elaine of going insane when Casey says Elaine killed Paulie only in order to save her.

Jonah and Chloe abandon them in anger and leave to find her kids. Casey starts barricading the house, after convincing her mother that the kids are attacking them due to their sickness. Meanwhile, Jonah and Chloe are separated in the woods, where Chloe is soon reunited with her kids, but Leah stabs her in the eye with a crayon, killing her. Casey finds Miranda beating Jinxie's corpse in the bedroom and throttles her; Jonah walks in and Miranda manipulates Jonah into believing that Casey attacked them, so Jonah pushes Casey away from her roughly and locks her in the bedroom. When they get downstairs, they flee the house using Chloe’s car (but not before Miranda steals her mother’s splints). In the house, as Elaine attempts to drag herself upstairs to free Casey, Leah and Nicky get into the house and Elaine manages to reach the bedroom door that Casey is locked in. Leah and Nicky catch up to Elaine, as tries to use a poker, but is unable to bring herself to hurt them. They both attempt to cut a wooden doll into her uterus.

Casey escapes the bedroom and kills Nicky and tries to stab Leah, but Elaine begs for her not to. So Casey and Elaine get into a car and start driving and find that the car Jonah was driving has crashed into a tree. Casey told Elaine to stay in the car while she went to check it out. She finds Jonah, dead by Chloe's crashed car. As Casey investigates Jonah's corpse, Miranda tries to attack her. Elaine could not get Casey's attention so she rams Miranda with the car, killing her and saving Casey. They suddenly notice a crowd of various infected kids, including Leah, emerge from the woods. As Elaine had just noticed Casey vomiting in the woods, she's unsure whether to let Casey accompany her. Ultimately, as the children encroach upon them, she's unable to leave Casey behind and they drive off. As Elaine panics, Casey, unresponsive, starts staring into space like the infected children did and the film ends leaving the audience wondering if the virus has infected Casey as well.

Cast

Locations
The film was shot in Cookhill Priory, a former Cistercian nunnery, and in the nearby villages of Cookhill and Alcester in the English counties of Worcestershire and Warwickshire, respectively.

Box office
The film opened at 10th place in the UK, grossing only £98,205 at 132 cinemas. In the weeks after its release, the film dropped to 13th place and then again to 22nd place.

Critical response
On Rotten Tomatoes, the film has an approval rating of 76% based on reviews from 17 critics. The site's consensus reads: "Unsettling and spine-chilling low-budget British horror, with effective and disturbing scares".

The film opened to generally positive reviews from UK critics. The Guardian writer Phelim O'Neill said, "the violence is skilfully enough executed to make you think you see much more than you actually do and the fundamentally disturbing and creepy aspects about such random and unpredictable child-centric mayhem are always present, no matter how ludicrously intense and darkly humorous things get". Time Out gave the film four out of five stars and said "This taboo-shattering movie taps in to primal fears about the unknow-ability of children, its blood-stained virgin snow and insidious terror recalling cruel fairy tales and ‘demon child’ movies such as The Omen."

In the United States reviewers were equally positive. Bloody Disgusting said "The Children has it all and is guaranteed to please even the hardest to satisfy horror fan." IGN said of the film "The Children is a flawlessly mounted horror film that knows exactly how to scare its audience."

Awards
Director Tom Shankland won the Special Mention Award at the Fantasia International Film Festival in 2009 for his professional approach to the children actors in the film.

References

External links
 

2008 films
2008 horror films
2000s horror thriller films
BBC Film films
British horror thriller films
British slasher films
Films about children
Films about dysfunctional families
Films about infectious diseases
Films about murderers
Films about siblings
Films about vacationing
Films set in country houses
Films set in England
Films set in the 2000s
Films shot in England
Vertigo Films films
Icon Productions films
Films set around New Year
2000s English-language films
2000s British films
British horror films